Colin Mackenzie of Portmore WS FRSE (1770-1830) was a Scottish lawyer and companion of Sir Walter Scott.

Life

Mackenzie was born on 11 January 1770 the son of Alexander Mackenzie of Portmore in Peebleshire and his wife Anne.

He went to school in Edinburgh and was a friend of Walter Scott, travelling with him in later life. He apprenticed as a lawyer with his father, Alexander Mackenzie WS at 14 Princes Street and qualified as a Writer to the Signet in 1790.

In 1800 he was operating as a lawyer from 14 Princes Street in Edinburgh’s New Town having then taken over his father’s firm.

He was Principal Clerk of Session to the Scottish Courts 1804-1808 and Deputy Keeper of the Signet 1820-1828.
In 1822 he was elected a Fellow of the Royal Society of Edinburgh, his proposer being James Skene of Rubislaw.

He died on 16 September 1830.

Family

His wife, Elizabeth Forbes (1781-1840), whom he married in 1803, was a great beauty and was painted by Sir Henry Raeburn. The painting is held by the Scottish National Portrait Gallery. Elizabeth was the daughter of Sir William Forbes, 6th Baronet of Pitsligo.

Their son, John Mackenzie, became Treasurer of the Bank of Scotland. 
Another son, Charles became a bishop of the Church of England. Another son, William became a politician and temperance reformer. A daughter, Anne, was a writer.

Artistic recognition

Mackenzie was sculpted by Thomas Campbell in the 1830s.

References

1770 births
1830 deaths
Scottish lawyers
Fellows of the Royal Society of Edinburgh